Karolina Gajewska (born 31 July 1972 in Działdowo) is a Polish politician. She was elected to the Sejm on 25 September 2005, getting 4784 votes in 34 Elbląg district as a candidate from the Law and Justice list.

See also
Members of Polish Sejm 2005-2007

External links
Karolina Gajewska - parliamentary page - includes declarations of interest, voting record, and transcripts of speeches.

1972 births
Living people
People from Działdowo
Members of the Polish Sejm 2005–2007
Women members of the Sejm of the Republic of Poland
Law and Justice politicians
21st-century Polish women politicians